Washougal High School was founded in the early 1900s. The first graduating class of four students was in 1914. The current campus was built in 1956 and remodeled in 2002. Known for its Fine Arts Programs. 887 students attend WHS as of the 2011–2012 school year.

History 
Washougal High School is a public school in the Washougal School District founded in the early 1900s in Clark County, Washington. The school, as of the 2006–2007 school year, hosted 836 students, with a teacher-student ratio of 1:21. The graduating class of 2011 included 180 students.

References

External links
Washougal High School Arts Dept.
Washougal High School
GSHL Football - Washougal High School

High schools in Clark County, Washington
Public high schools in Washington (state)
Washougal, Washington